"I Wanna Say Yes" is a song written by R.C. Bannon, and recorded by American country music artist Louise Mandrell.  It was released in August 1985 as the second single from the album Maybe My Baby.  The song was the highest-charting single of Mandrell's career, reaching number 5 on Billboard Hot Country Singles & Tracks.

Chart performance

References

1985 singles
1985 songs
Louise Mandrell songs
Songs written by R.C. Bannon
RCA Records singles